South Sea Love may refer to:

 South Sea Love (1927 film), an American silent drama film
 South Sea Love (1923 film), an American silent film